The men's 200 metre breaststroke was a swimming event held as part of the swimming at the 1936 Summer Olympics programme. It was the seventh appearance of the event, which was established in 1908. The competition was held from Thursday to Saturday, 13 to 15 August 1936.

Twenty-five swimmers from eleven nations competed. Several of the swimmers used butterfly-swimming strokes; the butterfly stroke was only developed in the early 1930s and was still regarded as a variant of breaststroke in 1936.

Medalists

Records
These were the standing world and Olympic records (in minutes) prior to the 1936 Summer Olympics.

In the first heat of the first round Tetsuo Hamuro set a new Olympic record with 2:42.5 minutes. He bettered his own Olympic record in the final with 2:41.5 minutes.

Results

Heats

Thursday 13 August 1936: The fastest three in each heat and the fastest from across the heats advanced to the semi-finals.

Heat 1

Heat 2

Heat 3

Heat 4

Heat 5

Semifinals

Wednesday 14 August 1936: The fastest three in each semi-final and the fastest fourth-placed advanced to the final.

Semifinal 1

Semifinal 2

Final

Saturday 15 August 1936:

References

External links
Olympic Report
 

Swimming at the 1936 Summer Olympics
Men's events at the 1936 Summer Olympics